The 1929 Minneapolis Red Jackets season was their fifth in the league and first as the Red Jackets. The team improved on their previous output of 0–6, winning one game. They finished 11th in the league. Prior to this season, the Red Jackets were the Minneapolis Marines.

Schedule

Standings

Roster
 Joseph Chrape
 Hal Erickson
 John Fahay
 Herb Franta
 Frank Gause
 Ken Haycraft
 Herb  Joesting
 Fritz Loven
 Bob Lundell
 LaDue Lurth
 Al Maeder
 Mally Nydahl
 Ben Oas
 Arnie Sandberg
 Rube Ursella
 Chet Widerquist
 Henry Willegale
 Lee Wilson
 Sam Young

References

Minneapolis Red Jackets seasons
Minneapolis Red Jackets
Marines